Lofty Naseem Mohamed is an Egyptian professional football manager.

Career
Since April 2012 until April 2014 he took charge of the Burundi national football team after the resignation of Adel Amrouche.

References

External links
Profile at Soccerway.com
Profile at Soccerpunter.com

Year of birth missing (living people)
Living people
Egyptian football managers
Expatriate football managers in Burundi
Burundi national football team managers
Place of birth missing (living people)